Klaus Brandner may refer to:

 Klaus Brandner (politician) (born 1949), German politician
 Klaus Brandner (skier) (born 1990), German alpine ski racer